Nepal Rastriya Dalit Mukti Sangathan is a Nepalese Dalit movement, linked to Janamorcha Nepal. Ahuti is the general secretary of the organisation. Ranendra Baraili is the president of the organisation.

References

Dalit wings of political parties in Nepal